The Stone Forest or Shilin is a notable set of limestone formations about 500 km2 located in Shilin Yi Autonomous County, Yunnan Province, People's Republic of China, near Shilin approximately  from the provincial capital Kunming.

The tall rocks seem to arise from the ground in a manner somewhat reminiscent of stalagmites, or with many looking like petrified trees, thereby creating the illusion of a forest made of stone. Since 2007, two parts of the site, the Naigu Stone Forest and Suogeyi Village, have been UNESCO World Heritage Sites as part of the South China Karst. The site is classified as a AAAAA-class tourist site.

Features

 
 Greater & Lesser Stone Forests - also known as the Lizijing Stone Forest
 Naigu Stone Forest
 Zhiyun Cave
 Lake Chang (长湖 literally Long Lake)
 Lake Yue (月湖 literally Moon Lake)
 Dadieshui Waterfall
 Qifeng Cave

These formations, caused by the weathering of limestone, are believed to be over 270 million years old and are a tourist attraction for both overseas and domestic tourists, with bus tours bringing tourists from Kunming. There are also a number of hotels in the area.

Geology
The Stone Forest area was a shallow sea some 270 million years ago. Extensive deposits of sandstone overlain by limestone accumulated in this basin during the Permian period of geologic time. Uplift of this region occurred subsequent to deposition. Later, exposure to wind and running water shaped these limestone pillars. These formations extend as far as the eye can see, looking like a vast forest of stone, hence the name "The Stone Forest". The Major and Minor Stone Forests are developed in the nearly pure limestone of the Permian Makou Formation. The Naigu Stone Forest, 9 km northeast of the Major Stone Forest, is developed in dolomite and dolomitic limestone of the Permian Qixia Formation. Both formations are of Lower Permian age. They aggregate 505 m in thickness and consist of shallow water (platform) massive limestone and dolomite, bio-clastic limestone, calcarenite and calcilutite. The Maokou Formation at Stone Forest appears to have been heavily altered diagenetically, and macroscopic fossil remains are seldom seen. Under the microscope, single whole or fractured fusulinid foraminifera are seen, commonly in biomicrite, biopelmicrite to biopelmicrosparite limestones. At least one zone of chert nodules occurs in the limestone. Unlike in the dolomitic Qixia Formation, dolomite in the Maokou Formation seldom ranges above 3%.

The strata are part of a gentle (2-6 degree) westward dipping monocline. Conjugate shear joints (NE-SW and NE-SE) are well developed and these fractures provided the main passageways for surface and underground water in the pre-karst development stage. The distribution, density and orientation of the fractures controlled the depth, size and orientation of the karst topography. Sandstones and shales of the Liangshan Formation that lies below the carbonate rock formations serve as a permeability barrier and force the local groundwater to flow from west to east.

Flora
The Shilin Karst area has the following types of forests and plant communities.

 Evergreen broad-leaved forest: Cyclobanopsis glancoides, Cyclobalanopsis delavayi, and Castanopsis delavayi
 Sclerophyllous evergreen broad-leaved forests: Quercus cocciferoides and Quercus franchetii
 Deciduous broad-leaved and subtropical needle-leaved forests: Pinus yunnanensis
 Lake vegetation: Ottelia acuminata

Other plant species
 Sino-Himalayan subregion species: Colquhounia, Corallodiscus, Docynia, Lysiontus, Physospermopsis, Prinsepia, Sinocrassula, Siphonostegia
 Sino-Japan forest subrealm species: Akebia, Conandron, Sinomenium, Platycladus
 East Asian Realm species: Ainsliaea, Bletilla, Codonopsis, Dendrobenthamia, Eriobotrya, Leptodermis, Lycoris, Ophiopogon, Patrinia, Reineckea

Culture
According to legend, the forest is the birthplace of Ashima, a beautiful girl of the Yi people. After falling in love she was forbidden to marry her chosen suitor and instead turned into a stone in the forest that still bears her name. Each year on the 24th day of the sixth lunar month, many Yi people celebrate the Torch Festival (火把节 Huǒbă Jié), which features folk dances and wrestling competitions.

See also
 Earth forest
 Pobiti Kamani
 Penitente (snow formation)
 Petrified Forest
 South China Karst
 Tsingy
 Tsingy de Bemaraha National Park (Madagascar)
 Tsingy de Bemaraha Strict Nature Reserve (Madagascar)
 Xingwen County

References

Further reading
 A virtual field trip to the stone forest, Kunming, Yunnan Province, China.
 Zhang, S. (1997). "Stone forest in China and pinnacle karst in Madagascar". In: Song, L. et al. (eds.) Stone Forest: a Treasure of Natural Heritage. China Environmental Science Press (see pp. 78–80), Beijing.
 How do stone forests get their spikes?

External links

 Global Network of National Geoparks: Stone Forest Geopark (Shilin Geopark)
 Travelchinayunnan.com: Shilin Stone Forest Geopark webpage

AAAAA-rated tourist attractions
First 100 IUGS Geological Heritage Sites
Geography of Kunming
Geology of Yunnan
Geoparks in China
Global Geoparks Network members
Karst formations of China
Karst formations of Yunnan
Tourist attractions in Yunnan
Yi people